The men's trap competition at the 2004 Summer Olympics was held on August 14 and 15 at the Markópoulo Olympic Shooting Centre near Athens, Greece. There were 35 competitors from 26 nations, with each nation having up to two shooters. 

Russia's Alexey Alipov attained an almost perfect score of 149 to tie the Olympic record for the gold medal in this event. The silver medal was awarded to Italy's Giovanni Pellielo with 146 points, while Australia's Adam Vella claimed the bronze with 145. Vella's teammate and two-time defending Olympic champion Michael Diamond missed a chance for his third Olympic gold in the final round, after firing only 119 birds to earn the eighth position in the prelims. Alipov's victory was Russia's first gold medal in the event. Pellielo, who had taken bronze in 2000, was the fourth man to earn multiple medals in the trap.

Background

This was the 19th appearance of the men's ISSF Olympic trap event. The event was held at every Summer Olympics from 1896 to 1924 (except 1904, when no shooting events were held) and from 1952 to 2016; it was open to women from 1968 to 1992.

Five of the 6 finalists from the 2000 Games returned: two-time gold medalist Michael Diamond of Australia, silver medalist Ian Peel of Great Britain, bronze medalist Giovanni Pellielo of Italy, fourth-place finisher Khaled Al-Mudhaf of Kuwait, and fifth-place finisher Marco Venturini of Italy. (The sixth finalist from Sydney, David Kostelecký of the Czech Republic, did not compete in Athens but returned to Beijing 2008 and won gold there.) The three World Champions since the 2000 Games were Diamond (2001, defending his 1999 title; he also took silver in 2002), Al-Mudhaf (2002), and Karsten Bindrich of Germany. Pellielo had made the podium twice in those three competitions (bronze in 2002 and silver in 2003). Other World medalists competing in Athens were Bret Erickson of the United States (silver 2001) and Alexey Alipov of Russia (bronze 2003). Diamond was favoured to win an unprecedented third gold in the event.

Fiji made its debut in the event. Great Britain made its 18th appearance, most among nations, having missed only the 1980 Moscow Games.

Qualification

Each National Olympic Committee (NOC) could enter up to two shooters if the NOC earned enough quota sports or had enough crossover-qualified shooters. To compete, a shooter needed a quota spot and to achieve a Minimum Qualification Score (MQS). Once a shooter was using a quota spot in any shooting event, they could enter any other shooting event for which they had achieved the MQS as well (a crossover qualification). There were 32 quota spots available for the trap event: 1 at the 2001 World Championship, 4 at the 2002 World Cup events, 2 at the 2002 World Championship, 4 at the 2003 World Cup events, 5 at the 2003 European Championships, 2 at the 2003 Pan American Games, 1 at the 2003 World Championship, 3 at the 2004 Asian Championships, 2003 Oceania Championships, and 2004 Asian Championships, and various invitational and additional places. In 2004, three crossover qualifications were used in the trap, all from men qualified in the double trap.

Competition format

The competition used the two-round 125+25 format introduced in 1996.

The event consisted of two rounds: a qualifier and a final. In the qualifier, each shooter fired 5 sets of 25 targets in trap shooting, with 10 targets being thrown to the left, 10 to the right, and 5 straight-away in each set. The shooters could take two shots at each target.

The top 6 shooters in the qualifying round moved on to the final round. There, they fired one additional round of 25 targets. The total score from all 150 targets was used to determine final ranking. Ties are broken using a shoot-off; additional shots are fired one at a time until there is no longer a tie.

Records

Prior to this competition, the existing world and Olympic records were as follows. 

Alexey Alipov matched the Olympic records for both the 125-target qualifying round (124) and the 150-target total (149).

Schedule

Results

Qualifying round

Final

References

External links
Official Results

Men's Trap
Trap at the Olympics
Men's events at the 2004 Summer Olympics